Service 710 is a commuter rail service operated by Companhia Paulista de Trens Metropolitanos in the Greater São Paulo, Brazil. It is a route that unifies both lines 7-Ruby and 10-Turquoise of the metropolitan rail network of the state of São Paulo. It offers a service from Jundiaí to Rio Grande da Serra stations and from Francisco Morato to Mauá during peak hours. Outside the Francisco Morato-Mauá loop, commuter will have to leave the train and wait for the next one to proceed, with a 12 minutes headway.

See also
 Companhia Paulista de Trens Metropolitanos
 Line 7 (CPTM)
 Line 10 (CPTM)
 Trens Intercidades

References

External links
 

Companhia Paulista de Trens Metropolitanos
Rapid transit lines in Brazil